Juan Alfonso Boekhoudt (born 27 January 1965) is an Aruban politician serving as the governor of Aruba since 1 January 2017. He previously served as minister plenipotentiary from 14 November 2013 to 17 November 2016.

Life
Boekhoudt was born on Aruba on 27 January 1965. Between 1991 and 1994 he worked in the cabinet of the minister plenipotentiary of Aruba. From 1994 to 2005 he worked as financial manager and director in the private sector. He served as director of the Aruba Ports Authority between 2005 and 2013. He also served as the chairman of the Aruba Red Cross between October 2010 and November 2013.

He was appointed as minister plenipotentiary of Aruba per 13 November 2013, he succeeded Edwin Abath. Boekhoudt was succeeded by Juan David Yrausquin on 17 November 2016.

Appointment as governor
In October 2016, the Council of Ministers of the Kingdom of the Netherlands appointed Boekhoudt as governor of Aruba per 1 January 2017. He was nominated by the Dutch minister of the interior and kingdom relations, Ronald Plasterk.

The move drew criticism from the Aruban cabinet, which stated that the rules of the Council of Ministers of the kingdom regarding gubernatorial appointments had not been followed. With the Aruban cabinet wishing that the appointment was reversed. The Dutch Ministry of the Interior and Kingdom Relations stated that the rules had been followed. The Aruban cabinet had nominated Finance Minister Angel Bermudez for the position.

The Aruban cabinet subsequently withdrew confidence in Boekhoudt, forcing him to resign as minister plenipotentiary of Aruba per 1 November 2016. On 18 October the conflict between Eman and Plasterk was settled, with Eman accepting the appointment of Boekhoudt, with the parties jointly declaring that the process was not handled perfectly.

References

1965 births
Living people
Aruban politicians
Governors of Aruba
Ministers plenipotentiary (Aruba)
Aruban businesspeople